Zarvan or Zaravan or Zarun or Zarwan may refer to:
 Zaravan, Fars
 Zarvan, Kurdistan